Kangchenjunga is the third highest mountain in the world.

Kanchenjunga, Kanchenjungha or Kanchanjangha may also refer to:

 Kanchenjungha (film), a 1962 film by Satyajit Ray
 Kanchanjangha, a 2019 Assamese-language film by Zubeen Garg
 Kanchenjunga Conservation Area, a protected area in the Himalayas of eastern Nepal
 Kanchenjunga National Park, a National Park and a Biosphere reserve in Sikkim, India
 Kanchenjunga, a mountain in Arthur Ransome's Swallows and Amazons series
 Kanchenjunga, the airliner which crashed on Mont Blanc on 24 January 1966 in Air India Flight 101

See also
 Kanchana Ganga (1984 film), an Indian film by V. Madhusudhan Rao 
 Kanchana Ganga (2004 film), an Indian film by Rajendra Singh Babu